This discography documents albums and singles released by British R&B/soul/pop singer Billy Ocean.

Albums

Studio albums

Compilation albums

Singles

1970s

1980s

1990s–2010s

Ocean-written songs recorded by other artists
"Are You Ready?" – La Toya Jackson
"Stay the Night" – La Toya Jackson
"Love Is a Dangerous Game" – Millie Jackson
"Love Is" – Randy Crawford
"Love Really Hurts Without You" – Bad Boys Blue
"Taking Chances" – Ray, Goodman & Brown
"Waiting For You" – Boyzone
"Whatever Turns You On" – The Dells
"Who's Gonna Rock You" – The Nolans
"Red Light Spells Danger" – Jeremy Clarkson, Richard Hammond, and James May Feat Justin Hawkins as the "Top Gear Band" on Top Gear of the Pops
"Suddenly" – Marti Pellow
"Get Outta My Dreams, Get into My Car" – Gwar
"When the Going Gets Tough, the Tough Get Going" – Boyzone

References

Discographies of British artists
Rhythm and blues discographies
Pop music discographies
Soul music discographies
Discographies of Trinidadian artists